Toke may refer to:

 Toke (lake) in Norway
 Toke (given name)
 Toke Atoll in the Marshall Islands
 Toke Station in Japan
 Toke, as in 'toke it up', refers to the smoking of cannabis

See also

 toque (disambiguation)